Abeking & Rasmussen (A&R) is a shipyard situated in Lemwerder, near Bremen in the German state of Lower Saxony. The shipyard is on the left bank of the River Weser, and currently comprises five production halls with associated workshops and offices, an inner harbour and a syncrolift.

The business was founded in 1907 by George Abeking and Henry Rasmussen. Rasmussen, who was known as a talented yacht skipper, proved to be equally adept as a yacht designer. In its early years, the yard worked for the private, commercial and military sectors, building wooden sailing yachts and motor yachts, together with patrol boats and other specialised vessels.

In 1928, the yard began building Starling Burgess' Atlantic one-design; at this time, the post-war economy made European-built boats attractive in the USA.

Today the yard continues to construct a similar spread of vessels, building yachts alongside naval vessels, pilot boats and similar ships. The yard is particularly well known for a number of superyachts, and for its work in the development of small-waterplane-area twin hull (SWATH) ships.

See also
List of yachts built by Abeking & Rasmussen

References

External links

 

Abeking & Rasmussen